Lecontes Mills is an unincorporated community in Clearfield County, Pennsylvania, United States. Lecontes Mills had a post office from February 29, 1856, until January 27, 1967; it still has its own ZIP code, 16850.

References

Unincorporated communities in Clearfield County, Pennsylvania
Unincorporated communities in Pennsylvania